Dennis Wilson Graham (June 14, 1896 – December 2, 1967), nicknamed "Peaches", was an American Negro league outfielder between 1921 and 1931.

A native of Proctorville, North Carolina, Graham attended Shaw University. He made his Negro leagues debut in 1921 with the Bacharach Giants. Graham went on to spend seven seasons with the Homestead Grays, and finished his career with a short stint with the Pittsburgh Crawfords in 1931. He died in Pittsburgh, Pennsylvania in 1967 at age 71.

References

External links
 and Baseball-Reference Black Baseball stats and Seamheads

1896 births
1967 deaths
Bacharach Giants players
Homestead Grays players
Pittsburgh Crawfords players
20th-century African-American sportspeople
Baseball outfielders